Harold "Hal" Sharp was an American judoka and author of books on judo.

Personal life
Sharp was born in 1927. Sharp was deployed with the army in 1945 to Japan and learned about martial arts.  He attended Los Angeles State College.

Judo competition
He earned his first black belt from the Kodokan. In Japan, he was assigned as being a body guard of Emperor Hirohito. He was a student of Takahiko Ishikawa. He was the winner of the first Foreign Judo Championships in 1954. He became captain of the 1955 US Goodwill Team. Sharp though stated that the Captain was John Osaka and he was a member of the team.

Author
He co-authored The Sport of Judo, Boys' Judo: Sport, Defense, and The Techniques of Judo (Tuttle Martial Arts). He served as a technical advisor for "Mrs Judo", a movie about Keiko Fukuda.  He is a 9th dan in Judo.  His final book was "The Road To Black Belt."

Judo career
Sharp had a number of Judo friends including that of Charles Palmer (judoka)  He also served as instructor for Star Trek's William Shatner.

Honors
Sharp was inducted into the USA Judo Hall of Fame in 2019. Sharp died on March 21, 2021.

References

1927 births
Living people
American male judoka
American judoka